George Avis Fulcher (January 30, 1922 – January 25, 1984) was an American clergyman of the Roman Catholic Church. He served as bishop of the Diocese of Lafayette in Indiana from 1983 until his death in 1984. He previously served as an auxiliary bishop of the Diocese of Columbus from 1976 to 1983.

Biography
George Fulcher was born in Columbus, Ohio, on January 30, 1922.He was ordained into the priesthood for the Diocese of Columbus by Bishop Michael Joseph Ready on February 28, 1948.

Auxiliary Bishop of Columbus 
Fulcher was appointed as an auxiliary bishop of the Diocese of Columbus and Titular Bishop of Morosbisdus by Pope Paul VI on May 24, 1976.  Fulcher was consecrated by Bishop Edward John Herrmann on July 18, 1976.

Bishop of Lafayette in Indiana 
On February 8, 1983, Fulcher was appointed by Pope John Paul II as bishop of the Diocese of Lafayette in Indiana. He was later appointed to the US Conference of Catholic Bishops committee for the implementation of the Pastoral Letter on Peace. 

While driving to a conference on January 25, 1984, George Fulcher was killed when his car crashed off US-41 near Rockville, Indiana. He was 62 years old at the time of his death.

References

External links
Roman Catholic Diocese of Lafayette, Indiana Official website

Episcopal succession

1922 births
1984 deaths
People from Columbus, Ohio
20th-century Roman Catholic bishops in the United States
Roman Catholic Diocese of Columbus
Roman Catholic bishops of Lafayette in Indiana
Religious leaders from Ohio
Catholics from Ohio